Spain women's national rugby sevens team participates in the European Women's Sevens Series and finished second overall in the 2012 FIRA-AER Women's Sevens Grand Prix Series. Spain qualified for the 2016 Summer Olympics by winning the 2016 Women's Rugby Sevens Final Olympic Qualification Tournament in Dublin, Ireland. They defeated Russia in the finals 19–12.

Tournament history

Summer Olympics

World Cup Sevens

World Rugby Women's Sevens Series

Team

Current squad
The following players have been called for the 2016 Dubai Women's Sevens.
 Head Coach: Eusebio Quebedo

Previous squads

Statistics

Most caps
Caps as of 30 June 2014

All-time Points in World Series
Points as of 2 December 2016

See also
Spain women's national rugby union team

References

External links
Official website
WorldRugby profile

 
Women's national rugby sevens teams
Sevens
World Rugby Women's Sevens Series core teams